Dina Jacobsen is a screenwriter, director, and actress.
She was born in Iraq and grew up in Beirut, Lebanon.
She started her career as an actress on BBC's Casualty.

She wrote, directed, and starred in the feature Coma Girl: The State of Grace (2005) which won the Viewer's Voice Award at Cinequest Film Festival in San Jose, California.

References

External links 

CultureUnplugged.com
Coma Girl: The State of Grace at the Cinequest.org
Fandango.com

Living people
Year of birth missing (living people)